Akil N Awan is a British academic and the current RCUK Fellow in the 'Contemporary History of Faith, Power and Terror' and Lecturer in both International Terrorism and Contemporary Islam in the Department of History and the Department of Politics and International Relations, at Royal Holloway, University of London (RHUL). He is also a current Research Associate both with the Centre for Ethnic Minority Studies (CEMS), and with the New Political Communication Unit (NPCU) at Royal Holloway. Previously he has served as a Research Associate on the ESRC project Shifting Securities: News Cultures Before and Beyond the Iraq War.

Research interests & expertise 
His key research interests at present are focused around:
 The history and evolution of al-Qaeda
 The rise of Global Jihadism
 The International Mujahideen movement during the Afghan-Soviet War (1979–89), the Bosnian War (1992–95), the First Chechen War (1994–96), the War of Dagestan (1999), the Second Chechen War (1999–2009) and the Insurgency in the North Caucasus (2009–)
 Root causes and antecedents of Islamic Political Radicalism and Terrorism (i.e. what is increasingly referred to as Radicalisation)
 The use of virtual media and the Internet by Jihadist groups;
 Changing configurations of religious authority sources/structures and its effects on increasing political radicalisation and ideological support for terrorism;
 Changes in religiosity and issues of identity formulation particularly vis-à-vis religion.
 He also teaches graduate courses on the History of Terrorism and New Political Communication.

Aside from being awarded the prestigious Research Councils UK Fellowship in 2006, he is also the current co-holder of a major ESRC & FCO research grant on 'Legitimising the discourses of radicalisation: Political violence in the new media ecology' under the New Security Challenges: Radicalisation & Violence programme.

He is a member of the War and Media Academic Network, the European Consortium for Political research (ECPR) Standing Group on Internet & Politics, and of the Muslims in Britain Academic Research Network (MBRN)

Akil Awan is regularly consulted by government bodies, other organisations, and the media in his fields of expertise, and has served in an advisory capacity and on numerous Working Groups for The Home Office, RICU, The Foreign & Commonwealth Office (FCO), the Office for Security & Counter Terrorism (OSCT), Joint Terrorism Analysis Centre (JTAC), Wilton Park, the International Centre for the Study of Radicalisation (ICSR), International Institute of Strategic Studies (IISS) & the Insurgency Research Group (IRG). He is also a regular commentator to the Media and his research has appeared in Dispatches (Channel 4), The Birmingham Post, The Western Mail, The Economist, the LA Times, Reuters, FOCUS (Ger), The Boston Globe (US), China Post, MSNBC (US), Sydney Morning Herald (Aus), BBC World Service, and Dawn (Pak).

Recent Publications 

 Awan, A. N. (2009) 'Success of the Meta-Narrative: How Jihadists Maintain Legitimacy', in CTC Sentinel, vol. 2(11): 6–9.
 Awan, A. N. & Al-Lami, M. (2009) 'Al-Qaeda's Virtual Crisis', in Journal of the Royal United Services Institute, vol. 154(1): 56–64.
 Awan, A. N. (2009) 'The Emperor's new words', in Britain in 2008 (ESRC).
 Awan, A. N. (2008) 'Antecedents of Islamic Political Radicalism Among Muslim Communities in Europe', in Political Science & Politics, vol. 41(1): 13–17.(Jan)
 Awan, A. N. (2007a) 'Transitional Religiosity Experiences: Contextual Disjuncture and Islamic Political Radicalism', in T. Abbas (ed.) Islamic Political Radicalism: A European comparative perspective, Edinburgh University Press: Edinburgh, pp. 207–30.
 Awan, A. N. (2007b) 'Virtual Jihadist media: Function, legitimacy, and radicalising efficacy', in European Journal of Cultural Studies (Special Issue), vol. 10(3), pp. 389–408.
 Awan, A. N. (2007c) 'Radicalization on the Internet? The Virtual Propagation of Jihadist Media and its Effects', in Journal of the Royal United Services Institute, vol. 152(3).
 Awan, A. N. (2009) 'Virtual Jihadist media', in Manual of Islamic Movements (Ed. F. Peter), Casa Arabe: Madrid (to be published in English, Spanish and Arabic).

He is currently working on three books on:
 'The Rise of al-Qaeda and the Global Jihad' for Routledge
 'Processes of Radicalisation' for EUP
 'Radicalisation & the Media' for Routledge (Co-authored with Hoskins & O’Loughlin)
 and is also editing a volume on 'Islamisms on the Internet'.

He is also working on a documentary on 'The History of al-Qaeda', to be released in 2011.

References

External links 
 Page on Dr Akil N Awan at the RHUL History Department website

British historians of Islam
Academics of Royal Holloway, University of London
Year of birth missing (living people)
Living people
British consultants
British people of Pakistani descent